The following persons have served as Master of Darwin College, Cambridge since its foundation in 1964.

 1964 - 1976 Frank George Young
 1976 - 1982 Moses I. Finley
 1982 - 1989 Arnold Burgen
 1989 - 2000 Sir Geoffrey Lloyd
 2000 - 2012 Willie Brown
 2012 - 2020 Mary Fowler
 2020 - Mike Rands

Masters
Darwin